Estádio Capital do Móvel is a multi-use stadium in Paços de Ferreira, Portugal. It is used primarily for football matches. The stadium is able to hold 9,077 people and was built in 1973 under the name Estádio da Mata Real. The stadium was renovated twice between 2000 and 2013, with the capacity increasing from the original 5,250 to 7,000 seats.

In 2017, the new north stand was inaugurated, increasing the stadium's capacity to the current 9,077 seats.

References

External links
 The Estádio da Mata Real at StadiumDB
 Frank Jasperneite page

External links
 ZeroZero Profile

Mata Real
F.C. Paços de Ferreira
Paços de Ferreira
Sports venues in Porto District
Sports venues completed in 1973
1973 establishments in Portugal